Justice Ervin may refer to:

Sam J. Ervin IV, associate justice of the North Carolina Supreme Court
Richard Ervin, chief justice of the Supreme Court of Florida
Sam Ervin, associate justice of the North Carolina Supreme Court

See also
Judge Ervin (disambiguation)
Justice Erwin (disambiguation)
Justice Irvin (disambiguation)